FWC may refer to:

 Fairfield Municipal Airport (Illinois), in the United States
 Fair Work Commission, in Australia
 Far West Capital, an American financial services company
 FIFA World Cup, an international football (soccer) competition held every four years
 Florida Fish and Wildlife Conservation Commission, an agency of the state government of Florida, United States
 Fortnite World Cup, an annual Fortnite video game competition
 Fort Worth Christian School, in North Richland Hills, Texas, United States
 Foster Wheeler Corporation, a Swiss engineering and construction conglomerate
 Frail Words Collapse, an album by American metalcore band As I Lay Dying
 Free Wesleyan Church, in Tonga
 Fujian White Crane, a Chinese martial art
 Future Worlds Center, a Cypriot humanitarian organization
 Female Water Closet, an abbreviation for a flush toilet
 Full well capacity, the maximum number of photoelectrons a pixel in an image sensor can hold
 Fast Wave Communications, an American telecommunications company